Wendell Marshall (October 24, 1920 – February 6, 2002) was an American jazz double-bassist.

Marshall was Jimmy Blanton's cousin. He studied at Lincoln University, then served in the Army during World War II. Following his discharge, he performed with Stuff Smith, then relocated to New York City, where he worked with Mercer Ellington. From 1948 to 1955, he performed with Duke Ellington.

Following his time with Ellington, Marshall joined pit orchestras on Broadway and freelanced with Mary Lou Williams, Art Blakey, Donald Byrd, Milt Jackson, and Hank Jones among others. He retired in 1968, and died of colon cancer in St. Louis, aged 81.

Discography
With Gene Ammons
Twisting the Jug (Prestige, 1961) – with Joe Newman and Jack McDuff
Soul Summit Vol. 2 (Prestige, 1961 [1962])
Late Hour Special (Prestige, 1961 [1964])
Velvet Soul (Prestige, 1961-62 [1964])
Angel Eyes (Prestige, 1962 [1965])
Sock! (Prestige, 1962 [1965])
With Dorothy Ashby
The Jazz Harpist (Regent, 1957)
With Shorty Baker and Doc Cheatham
Shorty & Doc (Swingville, 1961)
With Louis Bellson
The Driving Louis Bellson (Norgran, 1955)
With Eddie Bert
Musician of the Year (Savoy, 1955)
With Art Blakey
Art Blakey Big Band (Bethlehem, 1957)
Holiday For Skins (Blue Note, 1959)
With Kenny Burrell
Weaver of Dreams (Columbia, 1960–61)
With Kenny Clarke 
Kenny Clarke & Ernie Wilkins (Savoy, 1955) – with Ernie Wilkins
Klook's Clique (Savoy, 1956) 
With Arnett Cobb
Party Time (Prestige, 1959)
With Earl Coleman
Earl Coleman Returns (Prestige, 1956)
With Eddie Costa
Guys and Dolls Like Vibes (Coral/Verve, 1958) – with Bill Evans, Paul Motian
The House of Blue Lights (Dot, 1959) – with Paul Motion
With Eddie "Lockjaw" Davis
Misty (Moodsville, 1960) – with Shirley Scott
Trane Whistle (Prestige, 1960)
With Jimmy Giuffre
The Music Man (Atlantic, 1958)
With Grant Green
The Latin Bit (Blue Note, 1962)
With Dodo Greene
My Hour of Need (Blue Note, 1962) [bonus tracks]
With Tiny Grimes
Callin' the Blues (Prestige, 1958) – with J. C. Higginbotham
Tiny in Swingville (Swingville, 1959) – with Jerome Richardson
With Gigi Gryce
Jazz Lab (Columbia, 1957) – with Donald Byrd
Gigi Gryce and the Jazz Lab Quintet (Riverside, 1957)
Modern Jazz Perspective (Columbia, 1957) – with Donald Byrd
Doin' the Gigi (Uptown, 2011)
With Jimmy Hamilton
It's About Time (Swingville, 1961)
Can't Help Swinging (Swingville, 1961)
With Coleman Hawkins
Accent on Tenor Sax (Urania, 1955)
Soul (Prestige, 1958)
Coleman Hawkins All Stars (Swingville, 1960) – with Joe Thomas and Vic Dickenson
At Ease with Coleman Hawkins (Moodsville, 1960)
Things Ain't What They Used to Be (Swingville, 1961) as part of the Prestige Swing Festival
With Johnny Hodges
Blue Rabbit (Verve, 1964)
With Claude Hopkins
Yes Indeed! (Swingville, 1960) with Buddy Tate and Emmett Berry
Let's Jam (Swingville, 1961) – with Buddy Tate and Joe Thomas
Swing Time! (Swingville, 1963) – with Budd Johnson and Vic Dickenson
With Milt Jackson
Meet Milt Jackson (Savoy, 1956)
Roll 'Em Bags (Savoy, 1956)
The Jazz Skyline (Savoy, 1956)
 Jackson's Ville (Savoy, 1956)
With Willis Jackson
Cool "Gator" (Prestige, 1959)
Blue Gator (Prestige, 1960)
Cookin' Sherry (Prestige, 1959–60)
Together Again! (Prestige, 1959-60 [1965]) – with Jack McDuff
Really Groovin' (Prestige, 1961)
In My Solitude (Moodsville, 1961)
Together Again, Again (Prestige, 1960 [1966]) – with Jack McDuff
Thunderbird (Prestige, 1962)
With Illinois Jacquet
Desert Winds (Argo, 1964)
With Bill Jennings
 Enough Said! (Prestige, 1959)
 Glide On (Prestige, 1960)
With J. J. Johnson and Kai Winding
K + J.J. (Bethlehem, 1955)
With Lonnie Johnson
Blues by Lonnie Johnson (Bluesville, 1960)
With Hank Jones
The Trio (Savoy, 1955)
Bluebird (Savoy, 1955)
With Herbie Mann
Flute Flight (Prestige, 1957) – with Bobby Jaspar
Flute Soufflé (Prestige, 1957) – with Bobby Jaspar
Yardbird Suite (Savoy, 1957)
With Jack McDuff
Brother Jack (Prestige, 1960)
With Carmen McRae 
Carmen McRae (Bethlehem, 1954)
With Gerry Mulligan
Jazz Concerto Grosso (ABC-Paramount, 1957) – with Bob Brookmeyer and Phil Sunkel 
Two of a Mind (RCA Victor, 1962) – with Paul Desmond
With Oliver Nelson
Meet Oliver Nelson (New Jazz, 1959)
With Joe Newman
Joe's Hap'nin's (Swingville, 1961)
With Ike Quebec
Soul Samba (Blue Note, 1962)
With Betty Roché
Singin' & Swingin' (Prestige, 1960)
With Charlie Rouse and  Paul Quinichette
The Chase Is On (Bethlehem, 1958)
With Pee Wee Russell
Swingin' with Pee Wee (Swingville, 1960) – with Buck Clayton
With A. K. Salim
Flute Suite (Savoy, 1957) – with Frank Wess and Herbie Mann
With Shirley Scott
Soul Searching (Prestige, 1959)
With Al Sears
Rockin' in Rhythm (Swingville, 1960) – as The Swingville All-Stars with Taft Jordan and Hilton Jefferson
Swing's the Thing (Swingsville, 1960)
With Hal Singer
Blue Stompin' (Prestige, 1959) – with Charlie Shavers
With Al Smith
 Hear My Blues (Bluesville, 1959)
With Johnny "Hammond" Smith
Gettin' the Message (Prestige, 1960)
Stimulation (Prestige, 1961)
Opus De Funk (Prestige, 1961 [1966])
With Sonny Stitt
Sonny Stitt Plays (Roost, 1955)
Sonny Stitt with the New Yorkers (Roost, 1957)
With Buddy Tate
Tate's Date (Swingville, 1960)
With Clark Terry
 Clark Terry (EmArcy, 1955)
With Lucky Thompson
Lucky Thompson Plays Jerome Kern and No More (Moodsville, 1963)
With Ben Webster
Music for Loving (Norgran, 1954)
With Joe Wilder
Wilder 'n' Wilder (Savoy, 1956)
With Ernie Wilkins
Top Brass (Savoy, 1955)
With Lem Winchester
Winchester Special (New Jazz, 1959)
Lem's Beat (New Jazz, 1960)
With John Wright
Makin' Out (Prestige, 1961)
Mr. Soul (Prestige, 1962)
With Larry Young
Young Blues (New Jazz, 1960)

References

Scott Yanow, [ Wendell Marshall] at Allmusic

1920 births
2002 deaths
Musicians from St. Louis
American jazz double-bassists
Male double-bassists
Jazz musicians from Missouri
Duke Ellington Orchestra members
20th-century double-bassists
American male jazz musicians
20th-century American male musicians
United States Army personnel of World War II
Lincoln University (Missouri) alumni